USS Russell (DDG-59) is an  in the United States Navy. She is the second ship of the USN to carry the name Russell and is named for Rear Admiral John Henry Russell and his son, Commandant of the Marine Corps John Henry Russell, Jr.

Service history
The deployment was centered on an annual exercise called Cooperation Afloat Readiness and Training (CARAT) 2004.

On 15 April 2006, Russell provided aid to a fishing vessel in distress while operating in the South China Sea.

On 16 February 2007, Russell was awarded the 2006 Battle "E" award.

Between 17 and 21 May 2008, Russell participated in Exercise KhunjarHaad, a multi-national exercise held in the Gulf of Oman.

In June 2008, Russell rescued about 70 people from a disabled boat in the Gulf of Aden.

Russell is now permanently stationed in San Diego. Halsey was moved to Russell'''s former homeport, Joint Base Pearl Harbor–Hickam, with the former Russell crew.

On 4 June 2020, Russell'' conducted a transit of the Taiwan Strait.

Gallery

References

External links

Official site

The Destroyermen, Life Aboard USS Russell, through the eyes of her crew

 

Arleigh Burke-class destroyers
Destroyers of the United States
Ships built in Pascagoula, Mississippi
1993 ships